Kim Jung-Kwon (born July 7, 1969) is a South Korean film director and screenwriter.

Filmography 
Ivan the Mercenary (1997) - assistant director
Sky Doctor (1997) - assistant director
The Happenings (1998) - assistant director
The Spy (1999) - assistant director
Ditto (2000) - director, script editor
A Man Who Went to Mars (aka A Letter From Mars) (2003) - director, writer
BA:BO (2008) - director, screenwriter
Heartbreak Library (2008) - director, planner
Autumn Story (short film) (2009) - director, scripter
Snow in Sea Breeze (2015) - director, screenwriter
Lie After Lie (2020) - director

Awards 
2000 8th Chunsa Film Art Awards: Best New Director (Ditto)

References

External links 
 
 
 

1969 births
Living people
South Korean film directors
South Korean screenwriters